"Stop Living the Lie" is the debut single of Scottish singer-songwriter David Sneddon, taken from his album Seven Years – Ten Weeks. It was released through Mercury Records on 13 January 2003. During its first week of release, it charted at number one on the UK Singles Chart and reached number five in Ireland. Sneddon performed the song on the BBC's Fame Academy show, which he went on to win in December 2002.

Both the CD and cassette editions featured the radio edit of the song, a cover of Wet Wet Wet's "Goodnight Girl", and an acoustic version of Elton John's "Don't Let the Sun Go Down on Me", a song he performed live during the Fame Academy final shows.

Track listings
UK CD single
 "Stop Living the Lie"
 "Goodnight Girl"
 "Don't Let the Sun Go Down on Me" (acoustic)

UK cassette single
 "Stop Living the Lie"
 "Don't Let the Sun Go Down on Me" (acoustic)

Charts

Weekly charts

Year-end charts

Certifications

References

2003 debut singles
2003 songs
David Sneddon songs
Mercury Records singles
Number-one singles in Scotland
Songs written by David Sneddon
UK Singles Chart number-one singles